National Tertiary Route 605, or just Route 605 (or ) is a National Road Route of Costa Rica, located in the Puntarenas province.

Description
In Puntarenas province the route covers Puntarenas canton (Chomes, Guacimal districts).

References

Highways in Costa Rica